The 1997–98 season was PAOK Football Club's 71st in existence and the club's 39th consecutive season in the top flight of Greek football. The team entered the Greek Football Cup in third round.

Players

Squad

Transfers

Players transferred in

Players transferred out

Kit

Pre-season

Competitions

Overview

Alpha Ethniki

Standings

Results summary

Results by round

Matches

Greek Cup

Round of 32

Round of 16

Quarter-finals

Semi-finals

UEFA Cup

Second qualifying round

First round

Second round

Statistics

Squad statistics

! colspan="13" style="background:#DCDCDC; text-align:center" | Goalkeepers
|-

! colspan="13" style="background:#DCDCDC; text-align:center" | Defenders
|-

! colspan="13" style="background:#DCDCDC; text-align:center" | Midfielders
|-

! colspan="13" style="background:#DCDCDC; text-align:center" | Forwards
|-

|}	

Source: Match reports in competitive matches, rsssf.com

Goalscorers

Source: Match reports in competitive matches, rsssf.com

External links
 www.rsssf.com
 PAOK FC official website

References 

PAOK FC seasons
PAOK